Fujairah Fort is a fort in the city of Fujairah, United Arab Emirates (UAE). Dating back to the 16th century, it is the among the oldest as well as the largest castles in the country. It is noted for playing significant roles in fighting back the wave of colonialism. Today, it is among the main tourist attractions in the city. It is probably the oldest fort in the UAE and was occupied by the Wahhabists.

Location
The fort is located about 2 km from central modern Fujairah in the old Fujairah region, on a small rocky hill which reaches 20 meters high. It is around 1 km away from the coast.

Architecture and history
The fort is part of a complex with several old houses and a mosque. It is guarded by three round watchtowers and a square watchtower. The watchtowers and main building are connected by the walls, and there is a central hall surrounded by these towers and wall. The irregular shape of the castle is due to the uneven surface of the rock it sits on. The building is built of local materials, mostly rocks, gravels, mud, hay and plasters. Radiocarbon dating has identified the date of the construction as around 1500–1550. It was then renovated during 1650–1700. The British Navy destroyed three of the towers in 1925 during an action enforcing British anti-slavery policy. The bombardment was by HMIS Lawrence, resulting in the recovery of a fine of 1,500 rupees from the sheikh. The fort was restored by the Fujairah Administration of Antiquity and Heritage during 1997/2000 using the same materials with which it was built.

See also
 Fujairah Museum, nearby
 Sakamkam Fort, to the north

References

External links
 

16th-century fortifications
Buildings and structures completed in the 16th century
Castles in the United Arab Emirates
Forts in the United Arab Emirates
Buildings and structures in the Emirate of Fujairah
Fujairah City
History of the Emirate of Fujairah